The Solca gas field natural gas field is located near Solca in Suceava County. It was discovered in 2010 and developed by Europa Oil & Gas. It will begin production in 2012 and will produce natural gas and condensates. The total proven reserves of the Solca gas field are around 80 billion cubic feet (2.3 km³), and production is slated to be around 106 million cubic feet/day (0.6×105m³) in 2012.

References

Natural gas fields in Romania